Shotton is a village in County Durham, in England. It is situated to the north-west of Stockton-on-Tees.

Governance
An electoral ward with the same name exists. this stretches north to South Hetton and at the 2011 census had a population of 9,222.

References

Villages in County Durham
Sedgefield